Suat is a Turkish given name mostly for males. The name is the Turkish written form of the Arabic given name Suad.

People named Suat include:

 Suat Aşani (1916–1970), Turkish Olympic fencer
 Suat Atalık (born 1964), Turkish chess player
 Suat Derviş (1904 or 1905–1972), Turkish female novelist, journalist, and political activist
 Suat Günsel (born 1952), Turkish Cypriot entrepreneur, businessman and founder of the Near East University
 Suat Kaya (born 1967), Turkish footballer
 Suat Kılıç (born 1972), Turkish lawyer, journalist, and politician
 Suat Kınıklıoğlu (born 1965), Turkish politician, writer and analyst
 Suat Mamat (1930–2016), Turkish footballer
 Suat Okyar (born 1972), Turkish football coach and former footballer 
 Suat Serdar (born 1997), German footballer of Turkish descent
 Suat Suna (born 1975), Turkish pop singer and composer
 Suat Türker (born 1970), Turkish-German football player
 Suat Hayri Ürgüplü (1903–1981), Turkish politician and former prime minister
 Suat Usta (born 1981), Turkish footballer
 Suat Yalaz (born 1932), Turkish comic book artist

Turkish masculine given names
Turkish unisex given names